The Northeastern Military Command is one of eight Military Commands of the Brazilian Army. The Northeastern Military Command or "Comando Militar do Nordeste" (CMNE) is responsible for the defence of the states Bahia, Sergipe, Rio Grande do Norte, Paraíba, Pernambuco, Alagoas, Ceará, Piauí and Maranhão. Three Military Regional Commands are subordinated to the CML for administrative purposes.

Current Structure 

 Northeastern Military Command (Comando Militar do Nordeste) in Recife
 HQ Company Northeastern Military Command (Companhia de Comando do Comando Militar do Nordeste) in Recife
 4th Signals Battalion (4º Batalhão de Comunicações de Exército) in Recife
 4th Military Police Battalion (4º Batalhão de Polícia do Exército) in Recife
 5th Military Intelligence Company (5ª Companhia de Inteligência) in Recife
 3rd Conscription Division (3ª Divisão de Levantamento) in Recife
 Military High School Recife (Colégio Militar de Recife) in Recife 
 Military High School Fortaleza (Colégio Militar de Fortaleza) in Fortaleza 
 6th Military Region (6ª Região Militar) in Salvador covering the Bahia and Sergipe states
 HQ Company 6th Military Region (Companhia de Comando da 6ª Região Militar) in Salvador
 19th Hunters Battalion (19º Batalhão de Caçadores) in Salvador
 28th Hunters Battalion (28º Batalhão de Caçadores) in Aracaju
 35th Infantry Battalion (35º Batalhão de Infantaria) in Feira de Santana
 6th Military Police Battalion (6º Batalhão de Polícia do Exército) in Salvador
 6th Military Region Regional Maintenance Park (Parque Regional de Manutenção da 6ª Região Militar) in Salvador
 16th Signals Company (16ª Companhia de Comunicações) in Salvador
 7th Military Region (7ª Região Militar) in Recife covering the Rio Grande do Norte, Paraíba, Pernambuco and Alagoas states
 HQ Company 7th Military Region & 7th Army Division (Companhia de Comando da 7ª Região Militar e 7ª Divisão de Exército) in Recife
 7th Support Depot (7º Depósito de Suprimento) in Recife
 7th Military Region Regional Maintenance Park (Parque Regional de Manutenção da 7ª Região Militar) in Recife
 Recife Military Area Hospital (Hospital Militar de Área de Recife) in Recife
 João Pessoa Garrison Hospital (Hospital da Guarnição de João Pessoa) in João Pessoa
 Natal Garrison Hospital (Hospital da Guarnição de Natal) in Natal
 20th Military Service Circumscription (20ª Circunscrição do Serviço Militar) in Maceió
 21st Military Service Circumscription (21ª Circunscrição do Serviço Militar) in Recife
 23rd Military Service Circumscription (23ª Circunscrição do Serviço Militar) in João Pessoa
 24th Military Service Circumscription (24ª Circunscrição do Serviço Militar) in Natal
 2nd Guard Company (2ª Companhia de Guardas) in Recife
 10th Military Region (10ª Região Militar) in Fortaleza covering the Ceará and Piauí states
 HQ Company 10th Military Region (Companhia de Comando da 10ª Região Militar) in Fortaleza
 23rd Hunters Battalion (23º Batalhão de Caçadores) in Fortaleza
 25th Hunters Battalion (25º Batalhão de Caçadores) in Teresina
 40th Infantry Battalion (40º Batalhão de Infantaria) in Crateus
 10th Support Depot (10º Depósito de Suprimento) in Fortaleza
 10th Military Region Regional Maintenance Park (Parque Regional de Manutenção da 10ª Região Militar) in Fortaleza
 Fortaleza Garrison Hospital (Hospital da Guarnição de Fortaleza) in Fortaleza
 25th Military Service Circumscription (25ª Circunscrição do Serviço Militar) in Fortaleza
 26th Military Service Circumscription (26ª Circunscrição do Serviço Militar) in Teresina
 52nd Telematic Center (52ª Centro Telemático) in Fortaleza
 7th Motorized Infantry Brigade (7ª Brigada de Infantaria Motorizada) in Natal
 HQ Company 7th Motorized Infantry Brigade (Companhia de Comando da 7ª Brigada de Infantaria Motorizada) in Natal
 16th Mechanized Cavalry Regiment (16º Regimento de Cavalaria Mecanizado) in Bayeux
 15th Motorized Infantry Battalion (15º Batalhão de Infantaria Motorizado) in João Pessoa
 16th Motorized Infantry Battalion (16º Batalhão de Infantaria Motorizado) in Natal
 31st Motorized Infantry Battalion (31º Batalhão de Infantaria Motorizado) in Campina Grande
 17th Field Artillery Group  (17º Grupo de Artilharia de Campanha) in Natal
 7th Signals Company (7ª Companhia de Comunicações) in Natal
 7th Military Police Platoon (7º Pelotão de Polícia do Exército) in Natal
 10th Motorized Infantry Brigade (10ª Brigada de Infantaria Motorizada) in Recife
 HQ Company 10th Motorized Infantry Brigade (Companhia de Comando da 10ª Brigada de Infantaria Motorizada) in Recife
 14th Motorized Infantry Battalion (14º Batalhão de Infantaria Motorizado) in Jaboatão dos Guararapes
 59th Motorized Infantry Battalion (59º Batalhão de Infantaria Motorizado) in Maceió
 71st Motorized Infantry Battalion (71º Batalhão de Infantaria Motorizado) in Garanhuns
 72nd Motorized Infantry Battalion (72º Batalhão de Infantaria Motorizado) in Petrolina
 7th Field Artillery Group  (7º Grupo de Artilharia de Campanha) in Olinda
 14th Logistics Battalion (14º Batalhão Logístico) in Recife
 10th Mechanized Cavalry Squadron (10º Esquadrão de Cavalaria Mecanizado) in Recife
 1st Infantry Company  (1ª Companhia de Infantaria) in Paulo Afonso
 10th Combat Engineer Company (10ª Companhia de Engenharia de Combate) in São Bento do Una
 10th Signals Company (10ª Companhia de Comunicações) in Recife
 10th Military Police Platoon (10º Pelotão de Polícia do Exército) in Recife
 1st Engineer Group (1º Grupamento de Engenharia) in João Pessoa
 HQ Company 1st Engineer Group (Companhia de Comando do 1º Grupamento de Engenharia) in João Pessoa
 1st Construction Engineer Battalion (1º Batalhão de Engenharia de Construção) in Caicó
 2nd Construction Engineer Battalion (2º Batalhão de Engenharia de Construção) in Teresina
 3rd Construction Engineer Battalion (3º Batalhão de Engenharia de Construção) in Picos
 4th Construction Engineer Battalion (4º Batalhão de Engenharia de Construção) in Barreiras
 7th Combat Engineer Battalion (7º Batalhão de Engenharia de Combate) in Natal

References

Commands of the Brazilian Armed Forces
Regional commands of the Brazilian Army